TMF was a Belgian pay television channel whose programming was centred towards pop music videoclips. TMF was operated by Viacom International Media Networks.

Originally an abbreviation of "The Music Factory", the channel was launched as TMF Vlaanderen in 1998, mainly due to the success of the eponymous Dutch music television channel. The station began broadcasting on October 3, 1998.

The recordings of TMF Flanders occurred mainly in the Eurocam Media Center in Lint, there was until mid-2013 also established the parent company.

History 
TMF Flanders was launched on October 3, 1998. On October 5, 2015, Viacom announced that TMF will stop broadcasting om November 1, 2015. Thereby two Flemish youth channels (TMF and competitor JIM) disappeared in a short time. From November 1, 2015 Comedy Central took over the whole channel. Thereby the last TMF stopped and the brand completely disappeared.

See also
The Music Factory

References

External links
TMF Vlaanderen
Official Facebook page
Official Twitter page
Official Netlog page
Official Vimeo page

Music television channels
Television channels in Flanders
Television channels in Belgium
Television channels and stations established in 1998
Television channels and stations disestablished in 2015
Music organisations based in the Netherlands